The Central District of Minab County is a district (bakhsh) in Minab County, Hormozgan Province, Iran. At the 2006 census, its population was 170,419, in 34,176 families.  The District has two cities: Minab & Tirur.  The District has five rural districts (dehestan): Band-e Zarak Rural District, Gurband Rural District, Howmeh Rural District, Karian Rural District, and Tiab Rural District.

References 

Districts of Hormozgan Province
Minab County